Peristeri ( meaning pigeon) is a village and a community in the municipal unit of Amaliada, Elis, Greece. It is located in a rural, hilly area, 5 km southeast of Dafniotissa, 7 km southwest of Efyra, 9 km northwest of Karatoula and 11 km east of Amaliada. In 2011 Peristeri had a population of 309 for the village and 363 for the community, which includes the villages Asteraiika and Palaiolanthi.

Population

External links
 Peristeri on the GTP Travel Pages

See also

List of settlements in Elis

References

Populated places in Elis